The Rinkens riddare (Knight of the rink) is awarded to the most sportsmanlike player of the Swedish Hockey League (SHL). It was first awarded in 1962. From 1978-1997, the award was not given out, and it started up again in 1998.

Winners

Ice hockey people in Sweden
Awards established in 1963
1963 establishments in Sweden
Swedish ice hockey trophies and awards
Swedish Hockey League